Kikawada (written: 黄川田) is a Japanese surname. Notable people with the surname include:

, Japanese footballer
, Japanese actor
, Japanese politician

Japanese-language surnames